Cwmystwyth (also Cwm Ystwyth,) is a village in Ceredigion, Wales near Devil's Bridge, and Pont-rhyd-y-groes.

The Ordnance Survey calculates Cwmystwyth to be the centre point of Wales.

History 

Discovery of small, oval-shaped stone tools in the area points to the fact that it has been mined for lead since the time of ancient Britons and during Roman occupation. Documentation of mining activities occurred during the reign of Elizabeth I. She engaged the services of two German miners, then went on to sub-let to Hugh Myddleton.

The only significant flat area of the cwm is found before the river reaches maturity near Trawsgoed some  further west. Above the village to the east steep slopes rise to the Elenydd moors, above the cwm of the Nant Milwyn, at the head of the hill of Domen Milwyn.

Community Archive Wales Project
Cofnodion Cwmystwyth is a recently established local history group based in Cwmystwyth. The group has 14 regular members of various ages drawn from the Communities First area of Tregaron Uplands, all with a passion for the history of the area. As well as including images, the archive includes transcriptions of census data, baptismal registers and log books as a means of interpreting the history of the village. In the long-term, it is hoped that the project will act as a springboard for establishment of a Cwmystwyth History Society which would produce materials relating to the area and eventually to the creation of a heritage centre to showcase the history of the village. Cofnodion Cwmystwyth joined the Community Archives Wales project in 2007.

Climate
Cwmystwyth experiences an oceanic climate (Köppen climate classification Cfb) similar to almost all of Wales and the United Kingdom. This translates to a narrow range of temperatures, rainfall in all seasons and low sunshine levels, particularly at upland locations such as inland Wales.

The MetOffice maintains a weather station in the village, with online climate records dating back to 1959.

Rainfall, as one might expect for an elevated place in Wales, is high, at nearly 2000mm a year. At least 1mm will be observed on over 189 days of the year, on average. All averages refer to the period 1971–2000.

References

External links

Jenkinson's Practical Guide to North Wales
www.geograph.co.uk : Photos of Cwm Ystwyth and surrounding area
Community Archives Wales

Villages in Ceredigion
Geographical centres